The 1964–65 season of the European Cup Winners' Cup club football tournament was won by West Ham United in a final at Wembley Stadium against 1860 Munich. West Ham's Bobby Moore captained a side that also included Geoff Hurst and Martin Peters just one season before all three went on to star in England's World-Cup-winning side of 1966. As a result of their CWC success, Bobby Moore became the only captain to climb the Wembley steps to be presented with three different trophies in three successive seasons (English FA Cup and European Cup Winners' Cup with West Ham in 1964 and 1965 respectively, then the World Cup with England in 1966).

First round

|}

First leg

Second leg

Steaua București won 5–0 on aggregate.

Dinamo Zagreb won 3–2 on aggregate.

West Ham United won 2–1 on aggregate.

Torino won 5–3 on aggregate.

Second round

|}

First leg

Second leg

West Ham United won 3–2 on aggregate.

Torino won 6–0 on aggregate.

Dinamo Zagreb won 5–1 on aggregate.

Quarter-finals

|}

First leg

Second leg

West Ham United won 6–4 on aggregate.

Torino won 3–2 on aggregate.

Semi-finals

|}

First leg

Second leg

West Ham United won 3–2 on aggregate.

1860 Munich 3–3 Torino on aggregate.

Play-off

1860 Munich won 2–0 in a play-off.

Final

See also
 1964–65 European Cup
 1964–65 Inter-Cities Fairs Cup

External links
 1964–65 competition at UEFA website
 Cup Winners' Cup results at Rec.Sport.Soccer Statistics Foundation
 Cup Winners Cup Seasons 1964-65 – results, protocols
 website Football Archive 1964–65 Cup Winners Cup

3
UEFA Cup Winners' Cup seasons